Paeonol is a phenolic compound found in peonies such as Paeonia suffruticosa (moutan cortex), in Arisaema erubescens, and in Dioscorea japonica. It is a chemical compound found in some traditional Chinese medicines.

Biological effects 
A number of biological effects of paeonol in vitro or in animal models have been observed.  Paeonol increases levels of cortical cytochrome oxidase and vascular actin and improves behavior in a rat model of Alzheimer's disease. Paeonol also reduced cerebral infarction involving the superoxide anion and microglia activation in ischemia-reperfusion injured rats.

Paeonol shows antimutagenic activities. It also has anti-inflammatory and analgesic effects in carrageenan-evoked thermal hyperalgesia. Paeonol inhibits anaphylactic reaction by regulating histamine and TNF-α.

Paeonol has weak MAO-A and MAO-B inhibiting effects with IC50 values of 54.6 μM and 42.5 μM respectively.

Metal complex 
Metal complexes of paeonol shows tetrahedral and octahedral coordination geometry in the absence and presence of solvent pyridine respectively.

References 

Aromatic ketones
O-methylated phenols